Tell It to a Star is a 1945 American musical film directed by Frank McDonald, written by John K. Butler, and starring Ruth Terry, Robert Livingston, Alan Mowbray, Franklin Pangborn, Isabel Randolph and Eddie Marr. It was released on August 16, 1945, by Republic Pictures.

Plot
Carol Lambert is a cigarette girl in a posh Florida hotel. A note is delivered to the resort's bandleader, Gene Ritchie, requesting that Carol get a chance to sing. Gene already has a singer, Mona St. Clair, so the note causes resentment and Carol is fired.

Mrs. Whitmore, the hotel's owner, likes Carol and rehires her. Meantime, a con artist who calls himself "Colonel" Morgan turns up and, with partner Billy, begins scamming the hotel's guests. An embarrassed Carol tries to cover for him.

Morgan uses his charms to persuade Mrs. Whitmore to let Carol sing. She's a great success, but when an irate Mona reveals that Morgan's a con man who has even promised to deliver a new benefactor for the band, the musicians walk out. Carol arranges an all-female band for Gene and it's a hit. She and Gene hit it off, too.

Cast  
Ruth Terry as Carol Lambert
Robert Livingston as Gene Ritchie
Alan Mowbray as Colonel Ambrose Morgan
Franklin Pangborn as Horace Lovelace
Isabel Randolph as Mrs. Arnold Whitmore
Eddie Marr as Billy Sheehan
Lorna Gray as Mona St. Clair
Frank Orth as Augustus T. Goodman
Tom Dugan as Ed Smith
George Chandler as Al Marx
Mary McCarty as Miss Dobson
William B. Davidson as Brannigan
Aurora Miranda as Specialty Act

References

External links 
 

1945 films
1940s English-language films
American musical films
1945 musical films
Republic Pictures films
Films directed by Frank McDonald
American black-and-white films
1940s American films